The Country Hour is Australia's longest running radio program, established in 1945. The program is currently broadcast on all regional ABC Local Radio stations from midday to 1pm each weekday, presenting news from rural and regional Australia, with a heavy focus on the agricultural industry.

Programming
The program features live interviews and stories that are compiled by the ABC's rural reporters who are based at each regional station.  National Rural News, a national five-minute rural news bulletin is broadcast on The Country Hour at 12:06pm. General national news headlines are broadcast at 12:30pm followed by a weather update.  Market reports are delivered by designated correspondents just prior to the conclusion of the program at 1:00pm.

There are currently seven separate local editions of The Country Hour that are broadcast to each Australian state and territory, with the exception of the Australian Capital Territory. While the program is not aired on metropolitan ABC stations, but is streamed on their corresponding stations on the ABC Radio app.

Due to The Country Hour being aired at noon on regional ABC stations, the national current affairs program The World Today is aired on a one-hour delay in regional areas, whereas it is broadcast at midday on ABC stations in the capital cities.

History
The concept of The Country Hour arose during World War II when research indicated educational content on radio had the potential to increase productivity for the war efforts, particularly in the agriculture sector. John Douglass, an agricultural scientist with some international radio experience, convinced ABC management to establish a specialist rural department.  The ABC agreed and Douglass was subsequently appointed to lead the new department as "Federal Director of Rural Broadcasts". After recruiting some former ABC announcers to work on the program, it debuted on 3 December 1945 with presenter Dick Snedden welcoming listeners to "a program for the farm families of Australia".  The program was officially opened by Federal Minister for Agriculture William Scully.

Stories that had been planned for the first few weeks of The Country Hour included coverage of stock sales at Homebush; an interview with a Pheasant enthusiast; an educational piece about a poultry factory; and an account of haymaking at Hawkesbury Agricultural College.

The format of The Country Hour was strategically planned to ensure the program rated as highly as possible.  Airing from 12:15pm until 1:15pm, Douglass had programmed the show around a national news bulletin at 12:30pm and ensured the program was book-ended with a radio serial such as The Lawsons or Blue Hills.  Such radio serials were generally popular with women, but Douglass had some input into what script-writer Gwen Meredith included in her work, to make the serials more relevant to The Country Hour'''s audience.  This resulted in the inclusion of relevant and accurate farming references in serial's such as Blue Hills.

By the 1950s, the ABC had begun placing rural reporters at their regional stations so more locally-relevant stories could be presented to rural audiences, and enabling local state editions of The Country Hour. In 1951, the Victorian edition of The Country Hour broke the news of the decision to introduce the Myxoma virus into Australia in a bid to control the wild rabbit population, after Ian Clunies Ross told rural reporter Graham White about the plan.

An example of how revered the Country Hour is to listeners, a move to change the time of a two minute fruit and vegetable report broadcast on the West Australian Country Hour three times a week was debated in the Western Australian Legislative Assembly of the Parliament of Western Australia for two hours on Thursday 20 September 1990 in a motion moved by the Member for the South West The Honorable Bob Thomas.

In seconding the motion, the Honorable Member for Mining and Pastoral, Phil Lockyer described the Executive Producer of the ABC's Rural Department in Western Australia at the time, Tom Murrell as a very good officer of the ABC, greatly respected but forced to put in place a decision made by the ABC hierarchy.

70th Anniversary
In 2015, The Country Hour celebrated its 70th anniversary, prompting tributes from well-known figures and a mention in the Parliament of Australia when Western Australian Senator Dean Smith reflected on the rural issues and events that had been covered by The Country Hour particularly in Western Australia.

A special national edition of The Country Hour was broadcast on 3 December 2015, the 70th anniversary of the program's debut.

ABC Rural's television program, Landline also focused on the history of The Country Hour during a special episode reflecting on 70 years of ABC Rural, which effectively commenced with the debut of The Country Hour in 1945.

 75th Anniversary 
On 3 December 2020, The Country Hour celebrated its 75th anniversary with special broadcasts across the nation. The New South Wales edition of The Country Hour chose to honour the day by broadcasting from Cumnock in the state’s central west, in recognition of the town being home to the 2CR antennae, the state’s first and largest inland transmitter, and the first of its kind in the southern hemisphere. Cumnock had previously hosted the NSW edition of The Country Hour’s 60th anniversary in 2005.

 Awards 
In 1988, Tasmanian Country Hour'' presenter Tom Murrell won a Pater bicentennial media award, sponsored by the Australian Academy of Broadcast Arts and Sciences for Best Rural Radio Program for a 10-minute feature documenting the increase in Japanese tourism and how Tasmanian farmers could benefit from the boom.

Links 
ABC Rural Programs

References 

Australian radio programs